Adultspan Journal is a biannual peer-reviewed academic journal published by Wiley-Blackwell on behalf of the American Counseling Association and the Association for Adult Development and Aging (AADA).  The journal was established in 1999.  Its current editor-in-chief is Catherine B. Roland. The journal focuses on research, theory, and practice in the field of adult development and aging on issues that affect people in young, middle, and older adulthood.

References

External links 
 

Wiley-Blackwell academic journals
English-language journals
Publications established in 1999
Psychotherapy journals
1999 establishments in the United States